Châteauneuf-sur-Isère is a commune in the Drôme department in southeastern France.

Population

Personalities
It was the birthplace of St. Hugh of Châteauneuf.

See also
Communes of the Drôme department

References

Communes of Drôme